Alençon lace or point d'Alençon is a needle lace that originated in Alençon, France. It is sometimes called the "Queen of lace." Lace making began in Alençon during the 16th century and the local industry was rapidly expanded during the reign of Louis XIV by Jean-Baptiste Colbert, who established a Royal Workshop in the town to produce lace in the Venetian style in 1665.  The purpose of establishing this workshop was to reduce the French court's dependence on expensive foreign imports. Marthe La Perrière had modified the Venetian technique and Alençon emerged as a unique style around 1675 after Colbert's monopoly ended. The lace employs a mesh ground and incorporates pattern motifs with a raised outline of closely packed buttonhole stitches, an outer edge decorated with picots, and open areas with decorative fillings.

History

Though the demand for lace went into sharp decline following the French Revolution, it recovered some of its popularity during the Second French Empire. St.Marie-Azélie Guérin Martin, the mother of St. Therese of Lisieux was a famous lace-maker at Alençon. Bamba Müller, the wife of the Maharaja Duleep Singh, wore an Alençon trimmed gown on the occasion of her wedding in Alexandria, Egypt in 1864.  The manufacture of Alençon lace entered terminal decline at the end of the 19th century with changes in fashion and the development of cheaper, machine-made lace.

Hand-made lace-making survived on a small scale and the technique was preserved by Carmelite nuns in Alençon.  In 1976 a National Lace Workshop was established in the town to ensure that this lace-making technique survives.  There is a permanent exhibition of lace and a display showing how it is made in the Musée des Beaux Arts et de la Dentelle, located in the town centre and adjoining the Workshop.  The workshops themselves are open to the public only on certain days of the year.

UNESCO recognised the unusual craftsmanship of this lace and added it to its Representative List of the Intangible Cultural Heritage of Humanity in November 2010.

See also 
 Alençon
 Lace
 Brussels lace
 Flanders lace
 List of fabric names
 Normandy

Bibliography

Notes

External links 

 Alençon Lace - History
 Alençon Lace - Illustrated Description of Technique
 Alençon Museum of Fine Arts and Lace
 Alençon Tourist Office
 Shrine of Alençon - Zelie Martin, a famous lace-maker

Needle lace
Textile arts of France
Masterpieces of the Oral and Intangible Heritage of Humanity